Giuliano di Lorenzo de' Medici  KG (12 March 1479 – 17 March 1516) was an Italian nobleman, the third son of Lorenzo the Magnificent, and a ruler of Florence.

Biography

Born in Florence, he was raised with his brothers Piero and Giovanni di Lorenzo de' Medici, who became Pope Leo X; as well as his cousin Giulio de' Medici, who became Pope Clement VII.

His older brother Piero was briefly the ruler of Florence after Lorenzo's death, until the republican faction drove out the Medici in 1494. Giuliano moved therefore to Venice. The Medici family was restored to power after the Holy League drove the French forces that had supported the Florentine republicans from Italy. This effort was headed by Spain with the support of Pope Julius II. Giuliano reigned in Florence following his brother's election to the papacy in 1513, until he died in 1516.

He married Filiberta (1498–1524), daughter of Philip II, Duke of Savoy, on 22 February 1515 at the court of France, thanks to the intercession of his brother Giovanni, now pope as Leo X, in the same year that King Francis I of France (Filiberta's nephew) invested him with the title Duke of Nemours (which had recently reverted once again to the French crown) on the occasion. The French were apparently grooming him for the throne of Naples (in which the French maintained a historical interest), when Giuliano died prematurely. He was succeeded in Florence by his nephew Lorenzo II de' Medici.

Giuliano left a single illegitimate son, Ippolito de' Medici, who became a cardinal.

His portrait, painted in Rome by Raphael (a painter favored by Leo), shows Rome's Castel Sant'Angelo behind a curtain. (A studio version is at the Metropolitan Museum.)

Giuliano's tomb in the Medici Chapel of the Church of San Lorenzo, Florence, is ornamented with the Night and Day of Michelangelo, along with a statue of Giuliano by Michelangelo. Due to the identical common name (Giuliano de' Medici) that he shared with his uncle Giuliano di Piero de' Medici, whose tomb is also in the Medici Chapel and who is famous for being assassinated in the Pazzi Conspiracy, his tomb is often mistaken for that of his uncle.

Ancestry

References

Sources

External links

Giuliano de' Medici (1479–1516), Duke of Nemours at the Metropolitan Museum of Art

1479 births
1516 deaths
Nobility from Florence
G
Dukes of Nemours
Knights of the Garter
Captains General of the Church